Gloverin is an inducible antibacterial insect protein which inhibits the synthesis of vital outer membrane proteins leading to a permeable outer membrane. Gloverin contains a large number of glycine residues.

References

Protein families